Strymon alea, the Alea hairstreak or Lacey's scrub-hairstreak, is a butterfly of the family Lycaenidae. It was described by Frederick DuCane Godman and Osbert Salvin in 1887. It is found from north-western Costa Rica through Mexico to central and southern Texas. The habitat consists of subtropical thorn scrub.

The wingspan is 19–29 mm. Adults feed on flower nectar.

The larvae feed on the buds and flowers and Bernardia myricaefolia.

References

 Godman & Salvin in Butterflies of America page

alea
Butterflies of North America
Butterflies of Central America
Butterflies described in 1887
Taxa named by Frederick DuCane Godman
Taxa named by Osbert Salvin